SS Mayaguez  was a U.S.-flagged container ship that attained notoriety for its 12 May 1975 seizure by Khmer Rouge forces of Cambodia, which resulted in a confrontation with the United States at the close of the Vietnam War.

Service history 
The Mayaguez was first launched in April 1944 as SS White Falcon, a U.S. Maritime Commission C2-S-AJ1 freighter built by North Carolina Shipbuilding Company of Wilmington, North Carolina.

After World War II, the ship was sold to Grace Line and renamed the SS Santa Eliana.  Seeking to containerize its coffee bean traffic from Venezuela, in 1960 Grace had the Santa Eliana and her sister ship Santa Leonor lengthened and widened by the Maryland Shipbuilding and Drydock Company and converted into the first U.S.-flagged, all-container ships devoted to foreign trade, with a capacity of 382 containers below-deck plus 94 on-deck. With Grace Line's plans repeatedly frustrated by longshoremen opposition in both Venezuela and New York, the ship was sold in 1964 to the American container line Sea-Land Service and she was renamed SS Sea, and then SS Mayaguez (named after the city of Mayagüez on the west coast of Puerto Rico) in 1965. Her sister ship was renamed Land and then Ponce (after the city of Ponce on the south coast of Puerto Rico).

In 1967 Sea-Land began regular container service under contract to the Military Sea Transportation Service (MSTS) in support of American forces in Southeast Asia, with the Mayaguez being one of many Sea-Land ships employed. In 1975 the Mayaguez was sailing a regular route: Hong Kong – Sattahip, Thailand – Singapore.  On 7 May 1975, about a week after the fall of Saigon, Mayaguez left Hong Kong on what was said to be a routine voyage.

Capture and recovery 

The "Mayaguez incident" took place between Kampuchea (formerly Cambodia) and the United States from 12 to 15 May 1975, less than a month after the Khmer Rouge took control of the capital Phnom Penh ousting the U.S.-backed Khmer Republic. After the Khmer Rouge seized the ship in a disputed maritime area, the U.S. mounted a hastily-prepared rescue operation. U.S. Marines recaptured the ship and attacked the island of Koh Tang where it was believed, in error, that the crew were being held as hostages. Encountering stronger than expected defenses on Koh Tang, three United States Air Force helicopters were destroyed during the initial assault and the Marines fought a desperate day-long battle with the Khmer Rouge before being evacuated. Mayaguezs crew were released unharmed by the Khmer Rouge shortly after the attack on Koh Tang began.

Later career 
Duly retrieved from Khmer Rouge forces, the Mayaguez was taken out of service and eventually scrapped in 1979.

Citations

General and cited references 

 
 
 

Type C2-S-AJ1 ships
World War II merchant ships of the United States
Merchant ships of the United States
Container ships
Vietnam War merchant ships of the United States
1944 ships
Ships built in Wilmington, North Carolina
Captured ships